Aaron Sanders (born April 16, 1996) is an American actor, known for his roles as Morgan Corinthos in the soap-opera General Hospital and as Ethan in the movie No Greater Love. He has a younger brother, Cameron, who is also an actor. He now resides in Templeton, Ca.

Filmography

Television

References

External links
 

1996 births
Living people
American male child actors
American male film actors
American male television actors
Male actors from California
American male soap opera actors